Las Huacas may refer to:
Las Huacas, Coclé, Panama
Las Hucas, Veraguas, Panama